Prem Pratigyaa is a 1989 Indian Hindi-language romantic drama film starring Mithun Chakraborty and Madhuri Dixit. The film is directed by Bapu and written by Jainendra Jain. The film was a remake of the Tamil film Vandichakkaram and was a commercial success. 

At the 35th Filmfare Awards, Dixit received a nomination for Best Actress for her performance in the film.

Plot
Raja (Mithun Chakraborty) and his friend Charan (Satish Kaushik) come to a city to make a living. Failed in seeking job, one day, they are teased and ragged by Kallu Dada (Ranjeet). The quarrel gets physical and Raja wins it. Raja thus becomes the local underworld don and starts collecting protection money from shopkeepers. He also get addicted to alcohol. Raja meets with Laxmi (Madhuri Dixit) and is attracted to her, he comes to her assistance when her father, Mohan, passes away, by helping to cremate him; he comes to her aid again when Kallu and his goons attempt to molest her; and when the municipality tears down her hut, he decides to let her live with him. Due to her influence, he gives up his bad habits. As things go well, they both decide to get married. But on the wedding day, Laxmi's old beau, a Professor (Vinod Mehra), shows up and proposes marriage with her. Meanwhile, Raja is also arrested and held for killing Kallu.

Cast
 Mithun Chakraborty as Raja 
 Madhuri Dixit as Laxmi 
 Vinod Mehra as Professor 
 Satish Kaushik as Charan  
 Deven Verma as Hair Oil Salesman / Burglar  
 Aruna Irani as Thief
 Ranjeet as Kallu Dada  
 Nilu Phule as Mohan "Daddu"

Soundtrack
The music of the film is composed by Bappi Lahiri on lyrics written by Indeevar.

Awards
35th Filmfare Awards:

Nominated
 Best Actress – Madhuri Dixit

References

External links
 

1989 films
Films scored by Bappi Lahiri
1980s Hindi-language films
Films directed by Bapu
Hindi remakes of Tamil films